The Listening Post is a current affairs programme broadcast on Al Jazeera English, filmed and produced from AJE's hub in London at the Shard.

History
First aired in November 2006, along with Al Jazeera English, the show was an essential part of the station's original programming line-up and continues to be so until this day. Throughout the lifetime of the show, from launch to date, the show's presenter has been Richard Gizbert. Gizbert, a veteran of ABC News, was recruited in April 2006, in the run-up to the station's launch, to present the media-analysis show.

Format
The aim of the show is to offer a critique of journalism and of the media industry around the world today: "The Listening Post aims to monitor virtually all forms of media, from networks to bloggers, and report on what they do or do not cover."

Each episode presents:
 two in-depth reports, showing how the key stories of the week have been handled by the various players in the world's media. 
 a segment known as "The Download" (formerly "Global Village Voices") that airs viewers' comments on the stories featured.
 brief news-items on general developments in world of journalism.

Gizbert initiated a fast-paced and hard-hitting style that avoids the pitfalls of many similar shows, that rely on an interview style.

Gizbert takes the initiative and the responsibility for the analysis, but minimizes the risk by demonstrating the evidence for the deductions. Other broadcasters, by contrast, try to step back from responsibility by hosting interviews: this provides many assertions, but little analysis. The result is usually one of two equally unsatisfactory outcomes.

The Listening Post differs in that it tends to compare and contrast the original footage. This demonstrates quickly and succinctly not only what each player has put into their variant of the story, but also what each has left out. The footage also shows how the press can often be as conformist and subservient to those in power. In addition, the show has discussed a recurring journalistic tendency to regurgitate convenient 'factual' detail, without checking either the source of the material - and a possible agenda in offering it - or the methodologies, which can frequently be unscientific and specious.

Critique
Aaron Barnhart of The Kansas City Star said: it "might be the best media-critique program in English anywhere."

References

External links
Official site

2006 British television series debuts
Al Jazeera English original programming
Al Jazeera America original programming
Criticism of journalism
Television series about journalism